Lyman is an unincorporated community in Noble Township, Cass County, Iowa, United States.

History
Lyman's population was 26 in 1902, and 17 in 1925.

References

Unincorporated communities in Cass County, Iowa
Unincorporated communities in Iowa